Pierre-Jean Samot (born 21 August 1934 in Fort-de-France, Martinique) is a politician from Martinique.  He was Mayor of Le Lamentin
from 1989 to 2018. In the 2002 French legislative election he was elected to the National Assembly from Martinique's 3rd constituency.  However, his election  was invalidated by the Constitutional Council on 27 February 2003 and he was replaced by his substitute Philippe Edmond-Mariette.

References 
 page on the French National Assembly website

1934 births
Living people
People from Fort-de-France
Martinican Communist Party politicians
Build the Martinique Country politicians
French people of Martiniquais descent
Deputies of the 12th National Assembly of the French Fifth Republic
Black French politicians